Lisa Ferraday (born Lisa Demezey;March 10, 1921 – March 22, 2004) was a Romanian-American model and actress. As an actress she appeared in theatre, radio and television but is best known for her appearances as a leading lady in several Columbia Pictures films during the 1950s such as China Corsair.

Early years
An only child, Ferraday was born Lisa Demezey, daughter of Transylvanian diplomat Baron Demezey. In her childhood, she leaned to milk cows, care for chickens, and handle other responsibilities that were expected on the family's 7000-acre produce farm. She and her mother moved to Paris after her father died, and Ferraday began studying acting despite objections from her family. During World War II, she stopped acting and became an International Red Cross interpreter. Russian suspicions that she was a spy led to her imprisonment and torture. She eventually escaped to northern Italy.

Career 
Ferraday's films included Show Boat, Snows of Kilimanjaro, and The Merry Widow. In addition to acting, she worked as a production advisor in Hollywood, as a model, and as "a late-show disc jockey for a Hollywood TV station".

Personal life
Ferraday married Air Force Colonel E. L. Kincaid and came to the United States in 1948. They divorced in 1951. On October 17, 1958, she married industrialist John W. Anderson II in Detroit. She had a daughter, Carol.

In 1954, Ferraday won a New York legal case about the proceeds of a $50,000 life insurance policy designated to go to her 7-year-old daughter. A. Pam Blumenthal had taken the policy, but his widow, Emily Blumenthal sued, with her lawyer calling Ferraday "a homewrecker". The state supreme court jury awarded the money to Ferraday as guardian for her daughter.

Filmography

References

Bibliography 
 Alan G. Fetrow. Feature Films, 1950-1959: A United States Filmography. McFarland, 1999.

External links 
 

1921 births
2004 deaths
American film actresses
Romanian film actresses
People from Arad, Romania
20th-century Romanian actresses
Romanian emigrants to the United States
20th-century American actresses
21st-century American women